From Here on OUT is an American sitcom on Here TV, starring Terry Ray, T.J. Hoban, Suzanne Whang, Juliet Mills, Austin Robert Miller, Adrian Gonzalez and Michael Lanham. The series, which premiered on February 28, 2014, is the first original gay sitcom created by a gay network.

Synopsis
After years of failed attempts, aging gay writer Jimmy Randall (Terry Ray) finally sells his show Guy Dubai: International Gay Spy to the 18 year-old President of the tiny, financially strapped cable network Here TV with the deal breaking proviso that Jimmy must hire an openly gay leading man.

With a non-existent budget, that “proviso” was the easiest thing on Jimmy’s to do list when he casts breathtakingly sexy and talented Sam Decker (T.J. Hoban) – except Sam is secretly straight. To keep from losing their jobs, Jimmy and Sam must pretend to be an unlikely but believable couple as they, a sweet but slutty pool boy (Adrian Gonzalez), a diva maid / actress wannabe (Suzanne Whang), the teenage network president (Austin Robert Miller), and his domineering nanny / receptionist (Juliet Mills), along with a ridiculously hot office assistant (Michael Lanham), struggle every week to make a new television show ... and in the process, a new family.

Regular cast
 Terry Ray – Jimmy Randall
 Michael Lanham – Brad
 T. J. Hoban – Sam Decker
 Adrian Gonzalez – Rico
 Suzanne Whang – Divina
 Austin Robert Miller – Taylor
 Juliet Mills – Dottie Cooper

Guest cast
 Julie Brown
 Sam Pancake
 Jesse Pepe - Sean
 David Millbern
 Anthony Marciona
 Emrhys Cooper
 John J. Joseph
 Junade Khan
 Gary Anthony Stennette
 Spike Mayer
 Billy Yoder
 Lorielle New

References

External links
Article at NY Post

2010s American sitcoms
2014 American television series debuts
English-language television shows
Here TV original programming
2010s American LGBT-related comedy television series